Jorge Legorreta Ordorica (born 15 December 1970) is a Mexican politician affiliated with the PVEM. He served as Deputy of the LIX Legislature of the Mexican Congress representing the Federal District. He also served as Senator during the LX and LXI Legislatures.

References

1970 births
Living people
Politicians from Mexico City
Members of the Senate of the Republic (Mexico)
Members of the Chamber of Deputies (Mexico)
Ecologist Green Party of Mexico politicians
21st-century Mexican politicians